M. Carl Holman (June 27, 1919, Minter City, Mississippi, United States — August 9, 1988, Washington, D.C.) was an American author, poet, playwright, and civil rights advocate. One of his noted works is The Baptizin‘ (1971). In 1968, Ebony listed him as one of the 100 most influential Black Americans.

Holman grew up in St. Louis, Missouri. He was graduated magna cum laude from Lincoln University in 1942 and earned a master's degree from the University of Chicago. He then earned another master's degree from Yale University, where he attended on a creative writing scholarship.

He taught as an English professor at Clark College for 14 years and also taught at Hampton University and Lincoln University.

At one time, he edited the Atlanta Inquirer, a weekly black journal at Clark College that reported on civil rights issues in the South. In 1962, he moved to Washington, D.C., to work at the Civil Rights Commission, becoming its deputy director in 1966. He served on the Washington, D.C. Board of Higher Education, which governed the university that then was named, Federal City College. He also served as a housing consultant to the mayor of Washington, D.C.

From 1971 to 1988, he served as director of the National Urban Coalition, an organization formed after the riots of 1967, where he advocated for programs in housing, education, employment, and economic development. He became its president in 1971. At the time, the organization maintained chapters in 48 cities.

Personal 
He was married to Mariella Ukina Ama Holman and they had three children, a daughter, Kinshasha Holman Conwill, and two sons, Kwame Holman and Kwasi Holman.

References

1919 births
1988 deaths
Burials at Rock Creek Cemetery
20th-century American poets
20th-century American dramatists and playwrights
20th-century African-American writers
African-American poets
People from Minter City, Mississippi
Writers from Mississippi
Writers from St. Louis
Writers from Washington, D.C.
Lincoln University (Missouri) alumni
University of Chicago alumni
Yale School of Drama alumni
Clark Atlanta University faculty
Hampton University faculty
Lincoln University (Missouri) faculty